Jean Swanson  (born ) is a Canadian politician, anti-poverty activist, and writer in Vancouver, British Columbia. She represented the left-wing Coalition of Progressive Electors on Vancouver City Council as one of Vancouver's 10 at-large city councillors from 2018 to 2022.

Activism 
Jean Swanson is a coordinator of Carnegie Community Action Project (CCAP), an organization dedicated to the welfare of the Downtown Eastside, one of Canada's poorest neighbourhoods. She believes that "The way to 'revitalize' (the) community would be to restore purchasing power to the low-income residents who live (there): Raise welfare rates, end the barriers to getting on welfare and boost the minimum wage."

Swanson also founded and works with the group End Legislated Poverty, a British Columbia coalition with stated aims to "educate and organize in order to make governments reduce and end poverty".

In the 1980s, Swanson worked with the BC Solidarity Coalition, as well as Vancouver's Downtown Eastside Residents Association (DERA).

She was also previous national chair of the National Anti-Poverty Organization (NAPO), and Swanson is also the author of Poor Bashing: The Politics of Exclusion.

Awards and recognition 
In 2016, she was inducted into the Order of Canada, Canada's highest civilian honour, with the grade of member. Swanson was also the recipient of the 2007 Carleton University Kroeger College Award for Citizenship and Community Affairs, an award recognizing "creativity, persistence, and overall leadership in demonstrating the value of a locally based initiative." Swanson was chosen for the award "for her tireless work against poverty in Canada. (She) is a private individual living in Vancouver who the jury concluded best represented the qualities of commitment, leadership, and community ties."

In 2021, she was the subject of Teresa Alfield's short documentary film Jean Swanson: We Need a New Map.

Electoral record

References 

Canadian anti-poverty activists
Writers from Vancouver
Living people
Canadian women non-fiction writers
Members of the Order of Canada
Women in British Columbia politics
Coalition of Progressive Electors councillors
1940s births
Women municipal councillors in Canada
21st-century Canadian politicians
21st-century Canadian women politicians